The 2016 Sandwell Metropolitan Borough Council election took place on 5 May 2016 to elect members of Sandwell Metropolitan Borough Council in England. This was on the same day as other local elections.

Ward Results

St Paul's Ward

Wednesbury North

References

2016 English local elections
2016
2010s in the West Midlands (county)